Saat cigarettes are produced by AKJ Marketing (Malaysia) Sdn Bhd. It is the largest local cigarette brand in Malaysia.

References

External links
 AKJ Marketing (Malaysia) Sdn Bhd

Cigarette brands